The High Sheriff of West Sussex is annually appointed as the sovereign's representative in West Sussex county for all matters relating to the judiciary and the maintenance of law and order.

History of the office high sheriff

The oldest office under the crown, the office of High Sheriff is over 1000 years old, with its establishment before the Norman Conquest. The Office of High Sheriff remained first in precedence in the counties until the reign of Edward VII when an Order in Council in 1908 gave the Lord-Lieutenant the prime office under the Crown as the Sovereign's personal representative. The High Sheriff remains the sovereign's representative in the county for all matters relating to the judiciary and the maintenance of law and order.  Prior to 1974, there was one High Sheriff for the whole of Sussex.  The High Sheriff is appointed annually in March.

Roles and responsibilities 

High Sheriffs are responsible in the Counties of England and Wales for duties conferred by the Crown through Warrant from the Privy Council, including:
Attendance at Royal visits to the County
The wellbeing and protection of Her Majesty's High Court Judges when on Circuit in the County and attending them in Court during the legal terms.
The execution of High Court Writs and Orders (which is mainly achieved through the Under Sheriff)
Acting as the Returning Officer for Parliamentary Elections in County constituencies
Responsibility for the proclamation of the accession of a new Sovereign
The maintenance of the loyalty of subjects to the Crown

High Sheriffs of West Sussex 

1974-1975: Wing Commander Geoffrey Harry Briggs, DFC, DL  
1975-1976: Donald D Scott
1976-1977: David S W Blacker, DL
1977-1978: Geoffrey M Cresswell-Wall
1978-1979: Peter M Luttman-Johnson
1979-1980: The Hon Henry Edward Boscawen
1980-1981: Leslie Langmead
1981-1982: David I Bosanquet
1982-1983: Peter Langmead, OBE  
1983-1984: Edward John Frederick Green 
1984-1985: Major General John Cain Cowley, CB, DL
1985-1986: Major General Sir Philip John Newling Ward, KCVO, CBE, DL
1986-1987: James Frederick Godman-Dorington  
1987-1988: David Hugh Laing Hopkinson, DL
1988-1989: Ronald Charles Langmead
1989-1990: John Richard Bine Morgan-Grenville, DL, of Upperton, Petworth  
1990-1991: David William Bowerman, JP, DL
1991-1992: Michael Desmond Sugden, JP 
1992-1993: Jeremy Fox Eric Smith, DL 
1993-1994: Richard Harry Goring, DL 
1994-1995: Peter Longley, OBE, DL
1995-1996: Hugh Rowland Wyatt, DL
1996-1997: John Martyn Drysdale Knight, DL 
1997-1998: Col Sir Brian Walter de Stopham Barttelot, Bt., OBE, DL
1998-1999: Brian Sadler Leigh Trafford, DL
1999-2000: Judith Buckland, MBE, DL
2000-2001: Robert (Robin) Reginald Loder
2001-2002: Graham George Ferguson, DL
2002-2003: Mark William Burrell
2003-2004: Major Mark Frederick Hakon Scrase-Dickins CMG 
2004-2005: Roger William Hampson Reed 
2005-2006: (Vyvyan Alexander) Gordon Tregear
2006-2007: Charles Torquil de Montalt Fraser
2007–2008: Colin Peter John Field 
2008-2009: Sir Richard Drake Kleinwort, Bt.
2009-2010: Simon Fairfax Knight 
2010–2011: Mrs Elizabeth Bennett 
2011-2012: David Henry Tupper DL of Petworth 
2012-2013: Andrew John Patrick Stephenson Clarke 
2013-2014: (David) Patrick Henry Burgess MBE of Chichester 
2014–2015: Jonathan Charles Lucas of Warnham Park, Horsham 
2015-2016: Mrs Denise Lesley Anne Patterson of Aldwick Bay, Bognor Regis
2016–2017: (David) Mark Spofforth, OBE of Slindon, Sussex
2017–2018: The Lady Emma Lavinia Barnard of Parham Park, Pulborough
2018–2019: Mrs Caroline Nicholls of Worthing 
2019–2020: Mrs Davina Mary Irwin-Clark of Handcross, Haywards Heath 
2020–2021: Dr Timothy John Charles Fooks of Pulborough 
2021–2022: John Neil Hart of Bepton, Midhurst 
2022–2023: James Nicholas Whitmore of Pulborough 
2023–2024: Andrew Graham Bliss, QPM

References

Politics of West Sussex
West Sussex
 West Sussex
High Sheriffs